The Korea National League was a South Korean semi-professional football league held annually from 2003 to 2019. It was considered the second-highest division of the South Korean football league system before the K League 2 was launched in 2013, and the third-highest division since then.

History
The Korea National League was officially founded in the name of K2 League in 2003 to execute a plan to professionalize the Korean National Semi-Professional Football League. The participating clubs of the National League had to have their hometowns unlike in the Semi-professional League era.

In 2006, the K2 League was rebranded as the Korea National League, and its champions were decided to promote to the K League. However, Goyang KB Kookmin Bank and Hyundai Mipo Dockyard, the champions of the 2006 and 2007 season respectively, judged that they couldn't derive benefit from their professionalization, and rejected their promotion. The Korea Football Association and the K League Federation eventually prepared another project to found the second-tier professional league which is irrelevant to the National League.

At the end of 2019, the Korea National League was absorbed into the K3 League.

All-time clubs

Champions

List of champions

Titles by club

Sponsorship

See also
 South Korean football league system
 Korean Semi-professional Football League
 K3 League
 Korea National League Championship
 List of foreign Korea National League players

References

External links
 Official website 
 Twitter 

 
3
2003 establishments in South Korea
Sports leagues established in 2003
Third level football leagues in Asia